Julien Benneteau was the defending champion, but he did not participate this year.

Qualifier Thanasi Kokkinakis won the title, defeating Thiemo de Bakker in the final, 6–4, 1–6, 7–6(7–5).

Seeds

Draw

Finals

Top half

Bottom half

External Links
 Main Draw
 Qualifying Draw

BNP Paribas Primrose Bordeaux - Singles
2015 Singles